Dave Burrell Plays Ellington & Monk is a studio album released by jazz pianist Dave Burrell. It was first released by Denon Records on April 2, 1978. All of the songs on the album were originally written by Duke Ellington, Ellington's partner Billy Strayhorn, or Thelonious Monk.

Track listing
"In a Sentimental Mood" (Ellington, Kurtz, Mills) — 5:20
"Lush Life" (Strayhorn) — 6:58
"Come Sunday" (Ellington) — 4:47
"Straight, No Chaser" (Monk) — 8:30
"'Round Midnight" (Hanighen, Monk, Williams) — 7:36
"Blue Monk" (Monk) — 4:27
"Sophisticated Lady" (Ellington, Mills, Parish) — 7:42
"A Flower Is a Lovesome Thing" (Strayhorn) — 2:04

Personnel 
Dave Burrell — piano
Takashi Mizuhashi — bass

References

External links 
 

1978 albums
Denon Records albums
Dave Burrell albums